Office Workstations Limited (OWL) was a British software company based in Edinburgh.

OWL was founded in 1984 by five former employees of ICL (Ian Ritchie, Stuart Harper, Gordon Dougan, Richard Stonehouse and Dave MacLaren) who had previously worked at ICL's Scottish Development Centre at Dalkeith Palace until its closure the previous year.

The following year (1985), OWL International Inc., a United States subsidiary, was formed in Seattle.  The American subsidiary, then headed by ex-Microsoft executive Alan M. Boyd achieved considerable attention (particularly from Esther Dyson who understood its potential) but was eventually sidelined when Apple elected to bundle their Hypercard product free with every Macintosh.  This caused considerable consternation amongst Apple's developer community who became wary of Apple's motives for requiring developers to submit product designs for approval.

Hypertext Pioneer
OWL developed and supported Guide, a pioneering hypertext authoring system for the Apple Macintosh and Microsoft Windows, originally conceived at the University of Kent.

Guide was likely the first ever commercially available hypertext browser, when it was introduced on the Macintosh in 1986, nearly a decade before hypertext became the standard method of developing and browsing the Internet.

Ownership
OWL was bought for over £7m in 1989 by Matsushita Electric Industrial (MEI) of Japan and became Panasonic Office Workstations Ltd.. They subsequently developed software to support next generation consumer electronics., including DVD technology, Digital television, next generation mobile communications, Internet delivery of multimedia and 3D car navigation systems.

Spin Off Companies
A number of spin-off companies were formed by ex-OWL employees, including InfoAccess (a management buy-out of OWL International Inc.), Electrum Multimedia Ltd., CAPDM Limited, Data Discoveries Ltd. and Digital Bridges Ltd.

Closure
On 30 April 2005 Panasonic OWL was shut down.

References

Defunct technology companies of the United Kingdom
Software companies established in 1984
Software companies disestablished in 1989
Companies based in Edinburgh
British companies disestablished in 1989
British companies established in 1984